Literaturpreis der Konrad-Adenauer-Stiftung is a literary prize of Germany. The prize money is €20,000 and the prize ceremony takes place in Weimar. The first winner was Sarah Kirsch. The prize is awarded "to authors who give freedom their word". The Konrad Adenauer Foundation has been awarding the prize since 1993.

Recipients

 1993 Sarah Kirsch
 1994 Walter Kempowski
 1995 Hilde Domin
 1996 Günter de Bruyn
 1997 Thomas Hürlimann
 1998 
 1999 Burkhard Spinnen
 2000 Louis Begley
 2001 Norbert Gstrein
 2002 Adam Zagajewski
 2003 Patrick Roth
 2004 Herta Müller
 2005 Wulf Kirsten
 2006 Daniel Kehlmann
 2007 Petra Morsbach
 2008 Ralf Rothmann
 2009 Uwe Tellkamp
 2010 Cees Nooteboom
 2011 Arno Geiger
 2012 
 2013 Martin Mosebach
 2014 Rüdiger Safranski
 2015 Marica Bodrožić
 2016 Michael Kleeberg
 2017 Michael Köhlmeier
 2018 Mathias Énard
 2019 
 2020 
 2021 not awarded
 2022 Barbara Honigmann
 2023 Lutz Seiler

References

External links
 

German literary awards
Konrad Adenauer
Awards established in 1993
Culture in Weimar